Fitte de Soucy may refer to:

 Armand Louis Joseph de Fitte de Soucy (1796–1862), French soldier and governor of Martinique
 François Louis de Fitte (1751–1793), French royalist general during the French Revolution
 Louis Xavier de Fitte de Soucy (1775–1840), French landowner, diplomat and politician
 Marie Angélique de Mackau née de Fitte de Soucy (1723-1801), French court office holder
 Renée Suzanne de Soucy (1758–1841), wife of François-Louis de Fitte de Soucy, French court office holder